Jason Derulo (stylized as Jason Derülo) is the debut studio album by American singer Jason Derulo, released on February 26, 2010. The album was produced by J.R. Rotem and features the hit singles, "Whatcha Say", which reached number one on the US Billboard Hot 100; "In My Head" and "Ridin' Solo", which marks Derulo's third consecutive number-one in the UK R&B Chart.

Background
Derulo wrote songs for many successful artists from 2006 to 2009, and his debut single "Whatcha Say" was released on August 4, 2009. Produced by J.R. Rotem with additional production by Fuego, it samples the Imogen Heap song "Hide and Seek". In late August 2009, the song debuted at number 54 on the US Billboard Hot 100 before peaking at number one in November 2009. Due to Derulo's sudden success, he began work on his debut album.

By December 2009, the album was completed, and he subsequently released the second single from his album, "In My Head", on December 8, 2009. It debuted at #63 on the US Billboard Hot 100, and has since reached number five, becoming another top-ten hit for Derulo. Jason began promoting the album in late November 2009 by appearing as one of the opening acts for Lady Gaga's The Monster Ball Tour, which ended in 2011. 'Ridin' Solo' originally sampled "Bitter Sweet Symphony" by The Verve; however, the sample was not cleared and was subsequently replaced.

Singles
"Whatcha Say" was released as the lead single from the album on August 4, 2009. The single became available for digital download on May 5, 2009, but wasn't officially released until 4 August. The song samples heavily Imogen Heap's song "Hide and Seek", and reached #54 on the US Billboard Hot 100 in late August 2009. It peaked at number one on the Hot 100 in mid-November 2009, which made Derulo a star internationally, as the single reached the top-ten worldwide and reached number one in many other countries as well. The music video was filmed in August 2009 and was released in September 2009, and it received heavy rotation on VH1 and MTV. "In My Head" was released as the second single from the album on 8 December 2009. The single is more uptempo and dance-influenced than his debut single. The single debuted at #63 on the US Hot 100 in late December 2009 and has since reached number five on the Hot 100, becoming his second top-five hit in the US. Jason recorded a remix of the song with Nicki Minaj. It debuted at number one on the Australian Singles Chart on February 22, 2010, and number one on the UK Singles Chart.

"Ridin' Solo" was released as the third single from the album. The song officially hit US airwaves on May 11, 2010. It was released on May 31, 2010, in the UK. "Ridin' Solo" peaked at number two on the UK Singles Chart and has become his third UK R&B Chart number-one single. "What If" was released as the fourth single in the UK on July 26 and as the fourth single in the US. The video premiered online on July 10. On July 18, 2010, the song debuted on the UK Singles Chart at #40 and peaked at #12 becoming his first single not to reach the top-five and miss the top-ten altogether. "The Sky's the Limit" was released to Australian radio in early October, and the track debuted at #97 on the Australian ARIA Singles Chart on October 25, 2010. It peaked at #22 Jason's first single in 2011 is a duet with Beluga Heights label-mate Auburn, they put their spin on the 1980s classic by Michael Sembello, called "Maniac".

Critical reception

Jason Derülo received mixed reviews from critics upon its release, receiving an average score of 56 out of 100, indicating 'mixed or average' reviews, according to music review aggregator Metacritic. The most positive of reviews coming from Los Angeles Times's August Brown who gave the album two and half stars out of four, praising the album for its "array of earnest trance-pop, glossy guitar rock and buttoned-down R&B."  and called it "a pleasure-packed debut." He went on to praise Derulo's vocal ability for knowing "exactly when to deploy his Caribbean lilt to ramp up a song's melodrama, and it's one of his best vocal tricks".

AllMusic's David Jeffries was less impressed and gave the album three out of five stars criticizing the album for its "overall flow" and for only having nine tracks. Despite this Jeffries went on to praise the album for its ability to "get stuck in your head" and went on to call the album "one to admire rather than advocate", he went on to label the album's music as R&B. The most critical of reviews came from BBC Music's Mike Diver who criticized the album as a whole and called it "a deafening hollowness, an unashamed fakery akin to a dream-state where fantasy and reality have become mixed and hopelessly muddied" and "this soulless Auto-Tune-fest is one to avoid".

Commercial performance
The album debuted at number 11 on the US Billboard 200 with approximately 43,000 copies sold in its first week released. The album debuted at number eight on the UK Albums Chart, and returned to that position in late July following the release of its fourth single "What If".  As of April 2012, the album has sold 315,000 copies in the US.

Track listing

Sample credits
 "Whatcha Say" contains elements of "Hide and Seek", performed by Imogen Heap.
 "The Sky's the Limit" contains elements of "Flashdance... What a Feeling", performed by Irene Cara.
 "Love Hangover" contains elements of "Who Can It Be Now?", performed by Men at Work.
Notes
 The official track listing was confirmed by Jason's official website.

Charts

Weekly charts

Year-end charts

Certifications

Release history

References

2010 debut albums
Albums produced by J. R. Rotem
Jason Derulo albums
Warner Records albums